Villa Gregoriana is a park located in Tivoli, Italy. 

The park, located at the feet of the city's ancient acropolis, was commissioned by Pope Gregory XVI in 1835 to rebuild the bed of the Aniene River, which had been damaged by the flood of 1826.

History

Since ancient times, the river formed a wide curve around the acropolis, after which it fell from a limestone spur onto the plain below.  The river formed originally four falls, now reduced to two. The site had a strategical importance since it commanded the transumanza path from Abruzzo along the path which later become the Via Valeria. The Romans built hydraulic artifacts there, 12 of which are known by findings today.

It had fallen into ruin by the end of the 20th century, but was reopened to the public in 2005 thanks to a major landscape recovery project orchestrated by Fondo Ambiente Italiano (FAI), the National Trust of Italy.

The Site

Villa Gregoriana consists mainly of thick woodlands with paths that lead to the caves of Neptune and the Sirens, which form part of a series of gorges and cascades, and to the Great Waterfall.

The Aniene river valley and Villa Gregoriana were submitted in 2006 for consideration as a UNESCO World Heritage Site.

See also
Temple of Vesta (Tivoli)

Sources

References

External links

Official website 
Page at FAI's website 

Buildings and structures in Lazio
1835 establishments in Italy
Parks in Lazio